Shankar Singha is an Indian politician belonging to All India Trinamool Congress. He was elected as a legislator of West Bengal Legislative Assembly in 1996, 2001 and 2016. He joined Trinamool Congress on 21 June 2017 from Indian National Congress.

References

Living people
Trinamool Congress politicians from West Bengal
West Bengal MLAs 1996–2001
West Bengal MLAs 2001–2006
West Bengal MLAs 2016–2021
Year of birth missing (living people)